Freeway II: Confessions of a Trickbaby is a 1999 exploitation film and the sequel to Freeway (1996), written and directed by Matthew Bright. It stars Natasha Lyonne as Crystal "White Girl" Van Meter and María Celedonio as Angela "Cyclona" Garcia. While the first film was partly inspired by "Little Red Riding Hood", the second film is somewhat based on "Hansel and Gretel". An international co-production film between The United States and Mexico.

Plot
Crystal "White Girl" Van Meter is a 15-year-old prostitute who is sentenced to 25 years for a long list of crimes that include beating up and robbing johns. Transferred to a minimum security hospital to seek treatment for bulimia, White Girl teams up with Angela "Cyclona" Garcia, a lesbian teenage serial killer. Together, they escape from the hospital, despite White Girl injuring herself on a barbed-wire fence. Cyclona is convinced her beloved former caretaker Sister Gomez can help White Girl with her eating disorder and they head to Tijuana. On the way, Cyclona murders a family and has sex with the dead bodies. White Girl is not happy that Cyclona has stopped taking her meds and insists she continue to take occasional doses should they continue together. They steal the family's car and make their way south. On the way, Cyclona reveals how Sister Gomez saved her from being molested by her father and possibly aliens. After drinking one too many beers and huffing some paint, they crash and fall down a hill laughing.

Undaunted, the two fugitives catch a ride on a freight train only to be assaulted by a transient crack addict. Cyclona kills him to protect White Girl, and the two make off with his bag of crack and guns. Venturing into the woods, they leave a trail of crack which is picked away by shady men with crow feathers on their hats. Lost and confused, they make it to the border only to have a stand-off with two customs officials, both of whom Cyclona kills. White Girl, angry that Cyclona has murdered two law-enforcement officials, violently pistol-whips Cyclona and after making her point, the two race to the suburbs of Tijuana.

Upon their arrival in Tijuana, White Girl makes money by luring men to dark alleys on the promise of a good time and mugging them. Cyclona and White Girl check into a run-down motel where they have a moment with beer, a shower and a vibrating bed. White Girl finally gives in to Cyclona's sexual advances toward her and the two of them engage in some rampant lesbian sex.

After a few days, the two lovers find a poster that shows Sister Gomez is in town. Sister Gomez appears to be a Catholic/spiritualist healer; Cyclona is very keen that they visit her, for Sister Gomez has protected her from abuse in the past, and might be able to help them. They visit Sister Gomez at her gaudy mission house. Sister makes an enormous roast feast for her "little movie star" (Cyclona) and the friend "with the hungry demon" (Crystal), referring to her bulimia. Cyclona then disappears as White Girl is forced to work for Sister Gomez in the same way as she has been doing, in exchange for food. Finally, Crystal grows weary and makes her way to the basement, where she finds small children in a bondage room with a U.F.O shaped lantern. There is blood everywhere. Cyclona is hanging half-nude in a bondage style contraption. She tells Crystal that Sister Gomez made her watch while she chopped up children and made food out of them. She reveals that her ultimate plan for Crystal was to fatten her up with the meat of the children, and then, serve Crystal up for dinner as well. Crystal concludes that Sister Gomez is the witch-leader of a bizarre cult that rapes and eats children and then sells the child porn videos, protected by the front of a Catholic mission. Ready to deliver justice, White Girl frees Cyclona and kills all the cult members; she also reveals Sister Gomez to be a trans woman. Not succumbing to bullets, Gomez is thrown in the oven. Burning, Gomez screams of her 100,000 years of terror and the revenge from her father Jupiter that will ensue. White Girl, keeping a promise made earlier, is forced to kill Cyclona in a tearful scene rather than allow her to be captured. Cyclona, wishing to leave behind a life of abuse and violence, hopes to be reincarnated as an eagle (we discover that Sister Gomez was her earliest abuser). White Girl makes a deal with the federales and leaves with her lawyer/pimp, stating "I'm not hungry anymore."

Cast

Release
The film premiered in the "Midnight Madness" category at the 1999 Toronto International Film Festival. In the United States, it was released direct to video.

Reception 
On Rotten Tomatoes, the film has an approval rating of 36% based on 11 reviews.

The A.V. Club describes it as "a sketchy but eerily effective take on Hansel And Gretel, with the ever-eccentric Gallo making a profound impact as a creepily soothing, androgynous charlatan with sinister intentions." In Variety, Dennis Harvey opines "Lacking the inspired performances as well as wit, suspense, energy and crisp storyline of the first film, it trades in a strained sensationalism that soon waxes surprisingly dull."

References

External links
 
 
 
 Freeway II: Confestions of a Trickbaby at Tubi

1999 films
1999 comedy films
1999 LGBT-related films
1999 crime thriller films
1990s black comedy films
1990s comedy thriller films
1990s crime comedy films
1990s exploitation films
1990s serial killer films
American black comedy films
American comedy thriller films
American crime comedy films
American crime thriller films
American exploitation films
American LGBT-related films
American sequel films
Mexican black comedy films
Mexican comedy films
Mexican comedy thriller films
Mexican crime films
Mexican thriller films
Mexican LGBT-related films
Mexican sequel films
Films about cannibalism
Films about cults
Films about prostitution in the United States
Films about witchcraft
Films based on Hansel and Gretel
Films directed by Matthew Bright
Films set in Tijuana
Films shot in Mexico
Films shot in Vancouver
Films with screenplays by Matthew Bright
Lesbian-related films
LGBT-related comedy films
LGBT-related thriller films
Necrophilia in film
The Kushner-Locke Company films
1990s English-language films
1990s American films
1990s Mexican films